Allyltrichlorosilane is an organosilicon compound with the formula Cl3SiCH2CH=CH2.  It is a colorless or white low-melting solid.  It was originally prepared by the Direct process, the reaction of allyl chloride with copper-silicon alloy.

The compound is bifunctional, containing reactive trichlorsilyl and allyl groups. The SiCl3 group undergoes the usual alcoholysis to give the trialkxoyallylsilane.  In the presence of Lewis bases, the reagent allylates aldehydes.

References

Silanes
Organosilicon compounds
Allyl compounds